Taurus is Latin for 'bull' and may refer to:

 Taurus (astrology), the astrological sign
 Taurus (constellation), one of the constellations of the zodiac
 Taurus (mythology), one of two Greek mythological characters named Taurus
 Bos taurus, a species of cattle
 Taurus cattle, a breed of cattle

Geography 
 Taurus Mountains, a range in modern-day Turkey
 Montes Taurus, a mountainous region on the Moon
 Taurus Mountain, a summit in Canada

People 
 Tarrus Riley, reggae singer who initially worked as a deejay under the name Taurus
 Black Taurus (born 1987), Mexican wrestler also known as Taurus
 Gran Guerrero (born 1993), Mexican wrestler formerly known as Taurus
 Polo G (Taurus Bartlett, born 1999), American rapper

Romans
 Titus Statilius Taurus, the name of a line of four Roman senators
 Titus Statilius Taurus Corvinus, Roman consul in 45
 Taurus Volusianus, Roman consul in 261
 Taurus (consul 361), Roman consul in 361
 Taurus (consul 428), Roman consul in 428, nephew of the previous
 Taurus Seleucus Cyrus, better known as Cyrus of Panopolis, Roman consul in 441 and writer

Fictional characters 
 Taurus (Marvel Comics), a Marvel Comics villain
 Taurus (G.I. Joe), a character in the G.I. Joe universe
 Taurus, a.k.a. Ox, a character in the Mega Man Star Force TV series
 Taurus Bulba, a villain in the animated television series Darkwing Duck

Film
 Taurus (2001 film), a Russian film
 Taurus (2022 film), an American film directed by Tim Sutton

Music 
 Moog Taurus, a synthesizer; including the Taurus I, Taurus II, Taurus III
 TV-2 (band) (Taurus version 2), a Danish band
 Taurus (group), a girl band
 "Taurus Here", a 2005 song by Taurus
 "Taurus" (instrumental), a 1968 rock instrumental by Spirit
 Taurus I, Five Miles Out (Taurus II) and Taurus III, a trilogy of musical pieces by Mike Oldfield in the 1980s

Vehicles

Military
 Taurus space launch vehicle, the former name of the American Minotaur-C launch vehicle
 Taurus KEPD 350, a cruise missile
 HMS Taurus, two ships of the Royal Navy
 USNS Taurus (T-AK-273), a vehicle landing ship
 , a cargo ship in World War II
 USS Taurus (PHM-3), a hydrofoil formerly operated by the United States Navy
 Bristol Taurus, a 14-cylinder two-row radial aircraft engine; including the Taurus I, Taurus II, Taurus III
 Taurus Armoured Recovery Vehicle, a Canadian ARV based on the Leopard 1 tank
 XSSM-N-4 Taurus, a proposed cruise-missile conversion of the North American AJ Savage bomber

Civilian
 Ford Taurus, a full-size sedan (previously mid-size from 1986 to 2007) produced by the Ford Motor Company from 1986 to 2019
 Ford Taurus (China) a full-size sedan produced by Changan Ford since 2016
 South Devon Railway locomotive Taurus, a 0-6-0ST steam locomotive
 The Taurus Express, a Turkish passenger train
 Pipistrel Taurus, a two-seat, self launching ultralight sailplane
 ST Taurus, a tug in service with Panfido Rim., Italy 1949–1984
 Taurus (locomotive), a widely known name for the EuroSprinter 64 U+ locomotive
 Taurus II space launch vehicle, the former name of the American Antares rocket launch vehicle

Business
 Taurus (manufacturer), a Brazilian gun manufacturer
 Taurus Impact Systems, a business software producer and the precursor to Bullfrog Productions
 TAURUS (share trading), an unsuccessful IT project at the London Stock Exchange

Other
 Operation Taurus, a planned prosecution against Irish politician Martin McGuinness

See also 

 Tauris (disambiguation)
 Tauros (disambiguation)
 Centaur
 Minotaur
 Taro (river)
 Torus